Traffic Safety Store is a privately held U.S. traffic safety supply company and online retailers specializing in the manufacturing and distribution of road traffic control device ranging from traffic cones to speed bumps (Speed Bump), and other safety products. Traffic Safety Store is also a CPG product supplier. Additionally, Traffic Safety Store provides High visibility clothing and workwear.

Company overview 

Headquartered in West Chester, Pennsylvania, Traffic Safety Store is a privately held company whose primary shareholder is William Snook. Traffic Safety Store has 50,000+ customers in more than 10 countries.

Company history 

The company founded in 1997 as a spin-off of DuPont-Con Agra (DCV), was created to focus on the market trend in road traffic safety and global road safety for workers. It has since grown an independent technology team out of Philadelphia, Pennsylvania. and is looked to as a resource by nationally trusted organizations for current news on traffic and highway safety. Traffic Safety Store has also been cited for its specialized products in research reports submitted to the Department of Justice, and highly mobile worker protection systems.

References 

Manufacturing companies established in 1997
Privately held companies based in Pennsylvania
Manufacturing companies of the United States